Malcolm Roger Cannon (born 22 June 1944 in Birmingham) was an English ice skater. He won the gold medal in men's singles at the British Figure Skating Championships in 1963 and 1966 and finished 20th at the 1964 Winter Olympics.

Cannon also competed in ice dancing.  With partner Yvonne Suddick, he won the silver medal at the European Figure Skating Championships in 1967 and 1968.  They won the bronze at the World Figure Skating Championships in 1967 and the silver in 1968.

References

British male single skaters
English male ice dancers
1944 births
Olympic figure skaters of Great Britain
Figure skaters at the 1964 Winter Olympics
Living people
Sportspeople from Birmingham, West Midlands
World Figure Skating Championships medalists
European Figure Skating Championships medalists